HMS Broke was a  destroyer leader of the Royal Navy, initially built for the Chilean Navy as the  destroyer Almirante Goñi. The outbreak of the First World War led to her being purchased by the Admiralty in August 1914 shortly after her launching, and renamed HMS Broke. Broke saw action in several battles, and was resold to Chile after the conclusion of the war.

Building
Built as the Almirante Goni by J. Samuel White, East Cowes, HMS Broke was launched on 25 May 1914, and was completed in 1914.

Service

Battle of Jutland
Broke formed part of the 4th Destroyer Flotilla commanded by Captain Charles Wintour on board . During the night of 31 May the flotilla was stationed behind (north) of the Grand Fleet to guard against German attack and was heading south keeping station with the fleet. At around 23:15 Leading Torpedoman Cox on board , fourth ship in the twelve strong line, sighted three ships approaching. These were reported to Captain Wintour, who being unable to determine whether the ships were British or German issued a British challenge signal to the approaching ships. Shortly behind them, the battleships  and  also opened fire with their secondary armament. The ships were the van of the German High Seas Fleet, which was passing behind the British fleet.

The leading British ships, Tipperary, Sparrowhawk, HMS Garland,  and Broke all fired torpedoes at the German ships before turning away from the fire. Confusion as to the identity of the opposing ships persisted despite the outbreak of gunfire, so that Brokes captain ordered no torpedoes to be fired until he could positively identify the ships as German. This he did when a searchlight from one of the German ships caught one of her companions for long enough for it to be identified. None of the destroyers further behind felt sufficiently confident to open fire. In accord with standing orders to conserve torpedo stocks, each ship fired only one or two torpedoes, one of which struck Elbing, but in the dark it was unknown which ship had fired it. The German ships had turned away to avoid the torpedoes, and in the confusion Elbing was rammed by the battleship . Tipperary was set on fire in the engagement and sank around 02:00 the following morning. Elbing had to be abandoned and similarly sank around 03:40. Spitfire narrowly avoided being rammed by the battleship Nassau, ripping a hole in the side of the battleship as the two ships collided side to side, but then had to retire from the battle and limped home to England.

The remaining ships of the 4th Destroyer Flotilla formed up behind Commander Walter Allen of Broke, who was the half-flotilla leader and now assumed command. At around 23:40 large ships were again sighted and Allen attempted to challenge. Before he could do so, the German battleship Westfalen sent her own recognition signal and then turned on searchlights. The effect was devastating so that within a couple of minutes 50 crew were killed and another 30 injured, disabling the guns and preventing any effective activity on deck. The helmsman was killed at the wheel, and as he died his body turned the wheel, causing the ship to turn to port and ram Sparrowhawk. Both ships had already turned to port from line ahead to line abreast to fire torpedoes.

Sub Lieutenant Percy Wood saw Broke coming towards them at 28 knots, heading directly for Sparrowhawks bridge. He shouted warnings to crew on the foc'sle to get clear, and then was knocked over by the impact. He awoke to find himself lying on the deck of Broke. Wood reported to Commander Allen, who told him to return to his own ship and make preparations there to take on board the crew of Broke. Two other men from Sparrowhawk were also thrown onto Broke by the collision. Returning to Sparrowhawk, Wood was told by his own captain, Lieutenant Commander Sydney Hopkins, that he had just sent exactly the same message across to Broke. About 20 men from Sparrowhawk evacuated to Broke, while fifteen of Brokes crew crossed to Sparrowhawk.

At this point a third destroyer, HMS Contest steamed into Sparrowhawk, removing  from her stern. Contest was relatively unharmed and able to continue underway after the collision. Broke and Sparrowhawk remained wedged together for about half an hour before they could be separated and Broke got underway, taking 30 of Sparrowhawks crew with her. Broke remained able to manoeuvre, although she had lost her bow. At around 01:30 the ship again encountered German destroyers which fired about six rounds into Broke, which managed to return one shot before the ships separated. The ship proceeded slowly towards Britain but by 06:00 on 2 June found that she could no longer travel into the high seas with her damaged bow and had to turn back towards Heligoland. The seas abated and the ship was able to head for the Tyne, arriving some two and a half days after the engagement.

Dover Strait engagement
On 20–21 April 1917, Broke – together with another large destroyer leader,  – took part in the Battle of Dover Strait against a flotilla of six German torpedo boats from Zeebrugge who were attacking the Dover Barrage. In a confused action, Broke rammed , and the two ships became locked together. For a while, there was hand-to-hand fighting between the crews, as the German sailors boarded the British ship, before Broke got free and G42 sank. Badly damaged, Broke had to be towed into Dover, her casualties were 21 killed and 36 wounded. Her commander, Edward Evans, was awarded the Distinguished Service Order and was extolled in the British press as "Evans of the Broke". In a refit in March 1918, the forward side-by-side 4-inch guns were replaced by a single 4.7-inch gun.

Chilean service
HMS Broke was resold to Chile in May 1920, entering service with them as Almirante Uribe, where she was active until 1933.

Notes

Bibliography

Further reading
 Naval Review, 1917. pp. 174–175. Letter from a destroyer. (crew member describing the events of 31 May 1916)

External links 
 
 Battle of Jutland Crew Lists Project – HMS Broke Crew List

 

Almirante Lynch-class destroyers (1912)
Faulknor-class flotilla leaders
Ships built on the Isle of Wight
1914 ships
World War I destroyers of the United Kingdom
Almirante Williams-class destroyers
Maritime incidents in 1916